Osedax priapus is a species of bathypelagic annelid polychaete worms that consume the nutrients inside the bones of dead whales or other vertebrates.

Description
Unlike other species of Osedax, males of this species grow to full size and can feed independently of females, thus demonstrating reversal of sexual size dimorphism (SSD).

Etymology 
The name of O. priapus is borrowed from Priapus, the Greek god of procreation and the personification of the phallus.  The genus name Osedax is Latin for "bone-eater".

Anatomy 
Like other Osedax species, O. priapus has three segments: the roots, the trunk, and the gills. The roots act as a drill that secretes acid to burrow into the bone and uses symbiotic bacteria to absorb nutrients. The trunk is a gelatinous tube that surrounds the main body of the worm which they can retract into. The roots and trunk are surrounded in a mucus layer to protect both the worm, and the structure of the bone that supports them. The gills, or palps, help filter oxygen out of the water. The members of O. priapus have a yellow patch of pigment on the prostomium, just under the palps. They have been shown to stretch from lengths of 2mm to 15mm.

The female worms have an ovisac below the trunk, and an oviduct among the four palps, like the females of other Osedax species.  They tend to be smaller than other species on average, with other O. priapus males still being one-third of their size. 

The O. priapus males have testis sacs surrounded by the roots and a sperm duct connected to a seminal vesicle that opens just below the palps. The males have two palps rather than four, most likely for more efficient sperm transfer.

Reproduction 
Due to the males of O. priapus still resembling other Osedax species, they use their seminal vesicle on the head to store free sperm for mating with the females. The free sperm doesn't swim well through the sea water, meaning that O. priapus need to directly transfer the sperm. To combat this, the male worm uses their stretchable trunks to enter the female worm and release the sperm into the tube.

Advantages 
In other Osedax species, the sexual size dimorphism eliminated competition between male and female worms for limited resources like food or space. If there isn't competition over resources, the females in the species grow bigger and the amount of offspring they could have increases. 

In O. priapus, the males can only grow to sizes similar to that of the females because they are smaller than other Osedax species. Other species with larger growing females can rapidly colonize a bone, leaving nowhere else to land but other worms' plumes. O. priapus have more room on the bone to colonize, allowing the evolution of bone-feeding males. 

Along with less competition, as a mature worm feeding off of the bones, an O. priapus male can continuously make sperm, rather than the microscopic males of other species that are limited by the nutrients provided by a maternal yolk supply. If O. priapus males were to depend on such maternal yolk, they would not be able to produce much sperm as the eggs are much smaller than those of other Osedax. This species also has access to many more female worms who wouldn't need to take in larvae to host groups of males.

References

Sabellida
Animals described in 2014